TVARK is an online archival website of images, sound and video clips illustrating British television presentation history. Content includes idents, programme promotions, title sequences, public information films, commercials, daily start-ups and closedowns, break bumpers and station clocks. Each item has a short written analysis.

The selection of clips represents the work of many broadcasting and production companies, principally the national and regional divisions of the BBC and ITV, plus Channel 4/S4C, Channel 5, various British Sky Broadcasting (formerly Sky Television and British Satellite Broadcasting) networks, and a few other digital, satellite and cable channels. Programme clips are grouped into genres such as quiz shows, fundraising events and imported shows.

This website is dedicated to the founder's late mother, Valerie Hackett.

History
Television Ark was founded in the dial-up era on 8 November 1998, as a one-man hobby site.  There were just a few pages containing a handful of low resolution clips that were easy to download, but were smaller to look at than an average postage stamp. Over the years, clips and images grew in size and quantity. The site expanded and was run entirely as a hobby by an eight-man team, with updates and additions made whenever time permitted. In December 2005, they absorbed the remains of SchoolsTV.com, a website dedicated to television programming for schools.

During the summer of 2006, it was announced on their home page that they were having a summer break and would relaunch the site in the future. Unfortunately, higher resolution copies of previous clips were never made. The site relaunched on 25 December 2006 with very limited content, as well as few better quality clips put into a new download system in an effort to prevent hotlinking and preserve bandwidth. This proved very unpopular as clips took much longer to view, especially for those with slower internet connections. In addition, the relaunch saw the addition of a semi-transparent watermark (DOG) to new clips added to the site, to discourage "web snatching" of clips. Despite this, clips from TVARK have appeared on other sites, notably YouTube.

In July 2009, TVARK announced the end of RealMedia used on the site, with videos now using Adobe Flash streaming in H.264/MPEG-4 AVC, and the service called TVARK Interactive will include user accounts commenting on video statistics.

Since mid-2016, updates have ceased on the site. However, its social media pages (notably Facebook and Twitter) are being regularly updated with new material, with the site itself being offline starting in March 2017 for the preparation of a "brand new website". The site originally stated it would return "later in 2017". However, subsequent delays had continued to push back the launch date of the new site resulting in the site being offline for the entire rest of the decade. According to a message on the TVARK home page, the team were aiming to launch the new site "as soon as possible".

On 8 November 2019, TVARK announced that they would relaunch on 19 January 2020.  This new version of the website would contain more adverts, programmes, British and international channels, along with all videos previously on this site. The new website also has new and recaptured footage, adverts and intros of programmes. Shortly after the soft relaunch on 19 January of that year, the website went down due to connection error issues, citing "overwhelming demand", and would officially relaunch shortly after TVARK posted an update stating their website's tech head found the connection issues and that their staff were working to fix the issue quickly.  The site reappeared on 25 January. TVARK also stated on Twitter that while their site is in the Beta stage, their site could experience minor interruptions and brief outages during the Beta period. The original website, tv-ark.org.uk, is back up, but only the welcome screen is available.

Forums
It was decided in late December 2005 by TVARK's owners to close its forums. The forum was originally scheduled to close on 31 December, however the forums were removed earlier than planned on 18 December of that year. A new forum, The TV Lounge, was set up by the former forum staff as a separate venture. This forum closed in early 2007 and was replaced by The TV Shelter, which had most of the members from both its predecessors.

The TV Shelter closed on 8 April 2014, but remains open to visitors and past members as an archive. Another new forum, The TV Lounge, was established that same year (30 July) as an initial collaboration with two former members of The TV Shelter. The name was intended as a tribute to the community's heritage.

Since the closure of the TVARK forums, TVARK continues to operate as before, with a new guest book being established in its place.

In July 2022, TVARK relaunched its forum after the closure of TV Forum and its successor, TV Live Forum.

Sections
Following the major relaunch in January 2020, TVARK is divided into many sections that each cover programming, idents and presentation and other aspects of television:

Submitting material
The organisers accept tapes of vintage television presentation through the post.

Formats accepted by TVARK (in alphabetical order):

 Beta SP (PAL)
 Betamax (PAL)
 DigiBeta (PAL)
 DVCAM (PAL)
 DVCPRO (PAL)
 DVD-R / DVD+R (PAL & NTSC)
 HDCAM
 Mini DV (PAL)
 N1500/N1700
 U-matic
 Video 2000
 VHS (PAL & NTSC)

Reviews and awards
 Wanadoo (Summer 2004): Ten of Best (4)
 Web User (May 2004): Number 4 (Wallow in TV nostalgia)
 TV Cream (April 2004): TV Cream's Top 50 Media Movers & Shakers (48)
 BBC Somerset Sound: Discussing TVARK (Rating 5/5)

See also
 Prewar television stations
 Timeline of the introduction of television in countries
 Timeline of the introduction of color television in countries
 Geographical usage of television
 List of years in British television

References

External links
 

Internet properties established in 1998
Online archives of the United Kingdom
Television presentation in the United Kingdom
Television websites
Nostalgia websites
History of broadcasting
History of television in the United Kingdom
History websites of the United Kingdom